The R717 is a Regional Route in South Africa that connects Colesberg with Dewetsdorp via Trompsburg, Edenburg and Reddersburg. From Colesberg to Reddersburg, it follows the older route of the N1.

Route
It south-western terminus is in Colesberg, Northern Cape, at an interchange with the N1 National Route, the R369 Road and the R58 Road. From there, it heads north-north-east, crossing the Orange River into Free State.

The first town it comes to is Philippolis. From this town, it heads north-east to Trompsburg. At Trompsburg, it receives the south-eastern terminus of the R704. From Trompsburg until Edenburg, the route parallels the N1. In Edenburg's town centre, it turns east-north-east, crossing the N1 and proceeding to reach the N6 just 800 m south of Reddersburg.

It is briefly cosigned with the N6, heading north, before splitting off in central Reddersburg to continue in an easterly direction, reaching its north-eastern terminus of Dewetsdorp, where it ends at a junction with the R702.

References 

Regional Routes in the Free State (province)
Regional Routes in the Northern Cape